Speak and Destroy may refer to:
Speak and Destroy (My Ruin album), a 1999 album by My Ruin
Speak and Destroy (Escanaba Firing Line album), a 2003 album by Escanaba Firing Line